Presidential Proclamation 2714 (61 Stat. 1048) was signed by President Harry S. Truman on December 31, 1946, to officially declare the cessation of all hostilities in World War II. 

Even though the actual combat of the war ended May 8, 1945, in Europe and September 2, 1945, in the Pacific, the state of war was not lifted off of Japan and Germany in order to give a reason for the necessity of occupation troops in these countries. Once the War Crime Trials were over, the hostilities were seen as over.

Legal Effects

The signing of Proclamation 2714 is the legal basis for the end of World War II. As a result, any person who served between December 7, 1941, and December 31, 1946, is considered a World War II veteran. Furthermore, the signing of the proclamation coincided with the termination of wartime statutes. In 1976, President Gerald Ford signed Proclamation 4417 which declared that Proclamation 2714 voided the justification for Executive Order 9066 and thus made it inoperable.

Text
The Text of the Proclamation is as follows:

References

UCSB

Politics of World War II
Proclamations
1946 in military history
December 1946 events in the United States
Presidency of Harry S. Truman
United States presidential directives